Olympianus  (died 198) was the bishop of Byzantium for eleven years (187–198 AD). He succeeded Bishop Pertinax. In 196, Byzantium was conquered by Emperor Septimius Severus during his rivalry with Pescennius Niger.  Septimius Severus took the right of metropolis from the city and made it part of the Heracleia. Byzantium remained a bishopric under Heracleia for more than a century.

Olympianus' successor was Marcus I.

Sources
 www.ec-patr.org

2nd-century Romans
2nd-century Byzantine bishops
198 deaths
Bishops of Byzantium
Year of birth unknown